Fadhil Omer is the former Provincial Council Chairman (PCC) of Iraq's Dahuk province in Iraqi Kurdistan.

References
Dohuk Governor Visits UoD 21 April 2008
Assyrian Elected as Deputy Governor of Dohuk 6 April 2005

Dohuk Governorate
Iraqi Kurdistani politicians
Kurdistan Democratic Party politicians
Living people
Year of birth missing (living people)